Brambyvirus is a genus of viruses, in the family Potyviridae. Plants serve as natural hosts. There is only one species in this genus: Blackberry virus Y.

Structure
Viruses in Brambyvirus are non-enveloped, with flexuous and filamentous geometries. The diameter is around 12-15 nm, with a length of 800 nm. Genomes are linear and non-segmented, around 11kb in length.

Life cycle
Viral replication is cytoplasmic. Entry into the host cell is achieved by penetration into the host cell. Replication follows the positive stranded RNA virus replication model. Positive stranded RNA virus transcription is the method of transcription. The virus exits the host cell by tubule-guided viral movement.
Plants serve as the natural host. The virus is transmitted via a vector (unknown). Transmission routes are vector.

References

External links
 Viralzone: Brambyvirus
 ICTV

Potyviridae
Virus genera